Frederick Levi Attenborough (4 April 1887 – 20 March 1973) was a British academic and principal of University College, Leicester.

Biography
He was the son of Mary (née Saxton) and Frederick August Attenborough of Stapleford, Nottinghamshire. His parents were devout Methodists. He was educated at schools in Long Eaton. He became a teacher at the Long Eaton Higher Elementary School in 1913. The school was founded by Samuel Clegg, the headmaster, in 1910. He married the headmaster's daughter, Mary Clegg, in 1922. In 1915, he attended Emmanuel College, Cambridge as a Foundation Scholar and Choral Exhibitioner, and gained a first class degree in the Modern and Medieval Languages Tripos. From 1918 to 1920, he was a research student, and a fellow from 1920 to 1925. While a fellow, he published an edition and translation of the earliest English law-codes.

From 1925 to 1932, Attenborough was principal of the Borough Road Training College (became the West London Institute of Higher Education in 1976) in Isleworth.

Attenborough was principal of University College, Leicester from 1932 to 1951, and lived with his family on campus in College House (which now houses part of the university's Mathematics department).

During the Second World War, the Attenboroughs took in two Kindertransport Jewish refugee children, a pair of sisters, Irene Goldschmitt (married name) and Helga Waldmann (married name) who lived with them in College House. One of them encouraged his son David's fascination with the natural world by giving him a piece of amber.

Attenborough was an accomplished photographer. "The Leaves of Southwell" by Nikolaus Pevsner was published in 1945 with photographs by Attenborough of the carvings in the Chapter House of Southwell Minster.

Under Attenborough's guidance, the University College grew in size and reputation and eventually became the University of Leicester, receiving its royal charter in 1957.

The university's Attenborough Building, which includes an 18-storey tower and is the tallest building on the campus, was named in his honour. The building was opened in 1970. Attenborough was by this stage quite frail, so the building was opened on his behalf by his youngest son John.

Attenborough died in Wandsworth on 20 March 1973, at the age of 85.

Family
He was married to Mary Clegg, of New Sawley, from 1922 until her death in 1961. They had three children:

 Richard Samuel Attenborough (1923–2014), Lord Attenborough, the actor and director
 David Frederick Attenborough (born 1926), now Sir David, the TV naturalist
 John Michael Attenborough (1928–2012), Executive at Alfa Romeo

References

External links
 

1887 births
1973 deaths
People associated with the University of Leicester
Anglo-Saxon studies scholars
People from Stapleford, Nottinghamshire
Alumni of Emmanuel College, Cambridge
Frederick